Nancy Flavin (born June 26, 1950, in Northampton, Massachusetts) is an American politician who represented the 2nd Hampshire District in the Massachusetts House of Representatives from 1993 to 2003.

References

1950 births
Living people
Politicians from Northampton, Massachusetts
Women state legislators in Massachusetts
Democratic Party members of the Massachusetts House of Representatives
University of Massachusetts Amherst alumni
21st-century American women